Rajesh Tati (born 23 November 1995) is an Indian cricketer. He made his List A debut for Meghalaya in the 2018–19 Vijay Hazare Trophy on 20 September 2018. He made his Twenty20 debut for Meghalaya in the 2018–19 Syed Mushtaq Ali Trophy on 28 February 2019.

References

External links
 

1995 births
Living people
Indian cricketers
Meghalaya cricketers
Place of birth missing (living people)
Wicket-keepers